Songül Öden (born 17 February 1979) is a Turkish actress of Zaza descent. Her most successful roles were in the series Gümüş, Umutsuz Ev Kadınları, Serçe Sarayı and Kayıtdışı.

Life and career
Songül Öden was born in Diyarbakır. She spent her elementary school, high school and university years in Ankara. During high school days she attended the Ankara Arts Theatre and then in Hacettepe University she had part-time vocal training. She later graduated from Ankara University's theatre school. She was also a part of a project which was an adaptation of the poems of Atilla İlhan named Ne Kadınlar Sevdim with Enver Aysever as writer. After a while she left the state theatre and started to work in Istanbul in TV and theatre sector.

Songül has been acting on TV since 1999 when she did a TV series entitled Ferhunde Hanımlar. After that, she acted in five other TV series Vasiyet (2001), Havada Bulut (2002), Gümüş (2005–2007), Vazgeç Gönlüm (2008) and Mükemmel Çift (2010). After a project called Havada Bulut adapted from Sait Faik stories, she had a role in a television series drama called Gümüş where she acted side by side with Kıvanç Tatlıtuğ. The series lasted for 2 and a half years and had a record as the most popular project in the Middle East, the Balkans and Turkey. She was presented with an honorary award with Kıvanç Tatlıtuğ at the Muscat Film Festival. She was also a guest of honour at the Cairo Film Festival.

In 2009, she acted in a movie called Acı Aşk which is written by Onur Ünlü and in 2011 she appeared in 72. Koğuş which is a work by Orhan Kemal. Acı Aşk ("Bitter Love") in which she co-stars with Halit Ergenç, Cansu Dere and Ezgi Asaroğlu is her first-ever cinematic performance and was released on 18 December 2009. She also appeared in the Egyptian TV series Underground as a guest actress. Songül Öden returned to television in 2011 with the series Umutsuz Ev Kadınları.

Öden had been a part of a project in the Middle East about disapproval of women and child death in Palestine with eight world stars. In 2009 she was declared a Culture and Peace Envoy in Bulgaria.

Filmography

Theatre

 Yerma (1993) - Ankara Deneme Stage
 Yasar Ne Yasar Ne Yasamaz (1999–2000) - Trabzon National Theatre
 Birimiz Hep Icin (1999–2000) - Trabzon National Theatre
 Dort Mevsim (2003–2004) - Diyarbakir National Theatre
 Hortlak (2003–2004) - Diyarbakir National Theatre
 Ne Kadinlar Sevdim (2003–2004) - Cisenti Theatre
 Kadinciklar  (2007–2008) - Sadri Alisik Theatre
 Keşanlı Ali Destanı  (2011) - Sadri Alisik Theatre
 Küçük Adam Ne Oldu Sana?  (2012) - Sadri Alisik Theatre
 Kafkas Tebeşir Dairesi  (2013) - Sadri Alisik Theatre

Awards

 2008 – 8. Lions Theatre Awards, "Best Lead Actress" (Kadinciklar)
 2008 – Ismet Kuntay Theatre Awards, "Ismet Kuntay Incentive Award" (Kadinciklar)
 2011 – Siyaset Magazine Awards, "Special Award of Year"
 2012 – 18. Altın Objektif Ödül Töreni, "Best Comedy Actress" (Umutsuz Ev Kadınları)
 2012 – MUSCAT FILM FESTIVAL , "HONOUR AWARD"
 2012 – QUALITY OF MAGAZINES, ‘BEST ACTRESS AWARD’. (Umutsuz Ev Kadınları)
 2012 – MGD 18. ALTIN OBJEKTİF AWARD, ‘BEST ACTRESS IN COMEDY TELEVISION SERIES’ (Umutsuz Ev Kadınları)
 2013 – LIONS THEATRE AWARD, ‘BEST ACTRESS AWARD’ (KÜÇÜK ADAM NE OLDU SANA)
 2017 – Okan University, "Best Cinema Actress" (Rüzgarda Salınan Nilüfer)
 2017 – Uçan Süpürge 20, "International Women Movies Festival" "Special Award"
 2017 – 22nd Sadri Alışık Awards, "Cinema Selection Board Special Award " (Ekşi Elmalar) 
 2017 – Bilkent University, "Best Actress"
 2017 – Ankara Film Festival, "Best Actress" (Rüzgarda Salınan Nilüfer)

Sources

External links

1979 births
Living people
Kurdish actresses
People from Diyarbakır
Zaza_people
Turkish film actresses
Turkish television actresses
21st-century Turkish actresses
20th-century Turkish actresses